Marcus Marsollek (born 7 August 1965) is a German modern pentathlete. He competed for West Germany at the 1988 Summer Olympics.

References

External links
 

1965 births
Living people
German male modern pentathletes
Olympic modern pentathletes of West Germany
Modern pentathletes at the 1988 Summer Olympics
Sportspeople from Berlin